Horse Frightened by a Thunderstorm or White Horse Frightened by a Thunderstorm is a watercolour on paper work by Eugène Delacroix painted sometime between 1824 and 1829, most probably in 1824.

Showing a horse frightened by lightning beside the seashore, it was probably inspired by Théodore Géricault's Isabelle the Horse Frightened by A Thunderstorm (National Gallery, London), painted during that artist's stay in England Delacroix gave his watercolour to Baron Schwiter. In 1934 the art collector Pál Majovszky donated it to the Budapest Museum of Fine Arts, though it was loaned for the 1963 Paris exhibition on the centenary of Delacroix's death.

References

Watercolour paintings by Eugène Delacroix
1820s paintings
Horses in art
Water in art
Paintings in the collection of the Museum of Fine Arts (Budapest)